Fredrik Johansson Zanjanchi (born 6 February 1996) is a Swedish footballer who plays for Lindome.

References

1996 births
Swedish people of Iranian descent
Sportspeople of Iranian descent
Living people
Swedish footballers
Association football forwards
Hisingsbacka FC players
Örgryte IS players
FC Trollhättan players
Superettan players
Ettan Fotboll players